The Chinnocks are three villages in Somerset, England, south west of Yeovil in the South Somerset district:
East Chinnock
Middle Chinnock
West Chinnock

The origin of the name Chinnock is uncertain. It may be derived from the Old English cinu meaning ravine or cinn meaning a chin shaped hill, with the addition of ock meaning little. An alternative derivation may be an old hill-name of Celtic origin.

The three villages have been separate since at least 1066. East Chinnock and West Chinnock are some 3 km apart. Middle Chinnock is close to West Chinnock and since 1884 has been in the civil parish of West Chinnock, now named West and Middle Chinnock.

The three parishes were part of the hundred of Houndsborough.

References

Villages in South Somerset